Donna Kane is a Canadian poet from Rolla, British Columbia. She is most noted for her 2020 poetry collection Orrery, which was a shortlisted finalist for the Governor General's Award for English-language poetry at the 2020 Governor General's Awards.

Books
Somewhere, a Fire (2004)
Erratic (2007)
Pioneer 10, I Hear You (2016)
Summer of the Horse (2018)
Orrery (2020)

References

External links

21st-century Canadian poets
21st-century Canadian women writers
Canadian women poets
Writers from British Columbia
Living people
Year of birth missing (living people)